Wen Junjie (born 16 April 1997) is a Chinese professional footballer who currently plays as a defender or midfielder for Meizhou Hakka.

Club career
Wen Junjie was promoted to China League One side Hangzhou Greentown's first team squad in June 2017. On 24 June 2017, he made his debut for Hangzhou Greentown against Beijing Renhe in a 2–1 defeat. He went on to make three appearances for the club in all competitions in the 2017 season.

On 26 February 2018, Wen transferred to Chinese Super League side Tianjin Quanjian. On 18 April 2018, he made his debut for the club in a 3–2 away win against Kashiwa Reysol, coming on as a substitute for Pei Shuai in the 95th minute. After making his debut he would struggle to establish himself within the squad and was dropped to the reserves before being allowed to leave the club. 

On 6 April 2021 he joined second tier football club Meizhou Hakka as a free agent. He would make his debut in a league game on 3 September 2021 against Nanjing City in a 2-1 victory. He would be a squad player of the team that gained promotion to the top tier after coming second within the division at the end of the 2021 China League One campaign.

Career statistics
.

References

External links
 

1997 births
Living people
Chinese footballers
Footballers from Hunan
Zhejiang Professional F.C. players
Tianjin Tianhai F.C. players
Chinese Super League players
China League One players
Association football midfielders